Henrique Gomes may refer to:
Henrique Gomes (footballer, born 1991), Portuguese footballer
Henrique Gomes (footballer, born 1995), Portuguese footballer